

Incumbents
 President: Julio Argentino Roca

Governors
 Buenos Aires Province: Bernardo de Irigoyen 
 Cordoba: Donaciano del Campillo  
 Mendoza Province: Jacinto Álvarez

Vice Governors
 Buenos Aires Province: Alfredo Demarchi

Born
23 July - Julio Irazusta, writer and politician (died 1982)
24 August - Jorge Luis Borges, short-story writer, essayist, poet and translator (died 1986)
16 November - Leonardo Castellani, priest, essayist, novelist, poet and theologian (died 1981)
11 December - Julio de Caro, tango musician, conductor and composer (died 1980)

See also
1899 in Argentine football

References

 
History of Argentina (1880–1916)
Years of the 19th century in Argentina